The Tarsus Half Marathon is an annual road running event over the half marathon distance, which is held in March in Tarsus in Mersin Province Turkey.

The 2012 edition attracted 1,200 competitors from 16 countries. The elite level competition attracts top level international runners as well as national level runners. The event also features a shorter 5-kilometre race for fun runners.

The route celebrates the historic roads of Tarsus, which were built and used by the Romans around 500-600 A.D.

Past winners
Key:

References

External links
Official website

Half marathons in Turkey
Sport in Mersin
Tarsus District
2004 establishments in Turkey
Recurring sporting events established in 2004
Annual events in Turkey
Spring (season) events in Turkey